Giorgio Ursi (1 September 1942 – 8 October 1982) was a racing cyclist from  Italy. He was of Slovene ethnicity, and was also known as Jurij Uršič.

He competed for Italy at the 1964 Summer Olympics held in Tokyo, Japan in the Individual pursuit event where he finished in second place.

References

External links
Sports-reference

1942 births
1982 deaths
People from Doberdò del Lago
Italian Slovenes
Italian male cyclists
Olympic cyclists of Italy
Olympic silver medalists for Italy
Cyclists at the 1964 Summer Olympics
Olympic medalists in cycling
Medalists at the 1964 Summer Olympics
Cyclists from Friuli Venezia Giulia